is a role-playing video game (RPG) developed by Japan Media Programming and published by ASK Kodansha on July 25, 1997 for Sega Saturn. A port for the PlayStation, simply titled , was published on October 2, 1997.

The game features three cute girls as main characters solving a quest. The graphics of the game were dated already by 1997 and so it heavily stressed on voice acting. There was a lot of spoken parts albeit not all the actors were famous by the time the game was made.

Yui Horie also started her career as a voice actress in this game.

1997 video games
Japan-exclusive video games
PlayStation (console) games
Role-playing video games
Sega Saturn games
Video games developed in Japan